The 2007 Volta a Catalunya was the 87th edition of the Volta a Catalunya road cycling race, which took place from 21 May to 27 May 2007, in Catalonia. The race began in Salou with a team time trial and ended in Barcelona. The race was won by Russian Vladimir Karpets of the  team, who won the race thanks to winning the team time trial, and second placings on the toughest mountain stage (stage 4) and the mountain time trial (stage 5).

Twenty-five teams took part. The five wildcards have were awarded to Karpin–Galicia, Relax–GAM, Andalucía–CajaSur, Fuerteventura–Canarias and Slipstream–Chipotle.

Teams
Twenty-five teams of up to eight riders started the race:

Route

Stages

Stage 1
21 May 2007: Salou to Salou,  (TTT)

Stage 2
22 May 2007: Salou to Perafort,

Stage 3
23 May 2007: Perafort to Tàrrega,

Stage 4
24 May 2007: Tàrrega to Vallnord-Arinsal (Andorra),

Stage 5
25 May 2007: Sornas to Vallnord-Arcalís (Andorra),  (ITT)

Stage 6
26 May 2007: Llívia to Lloret de Mar,

Stage 7
27 May 2007: Lloret de Mar to Barcelona,

Final standing

General classification

Mountains classification

Points classification

Sprints classification

Team classification

Jersey progress

Individual 2007 UCI ProTour standings after race 
As of 27 May 2007, after the Volta a Catalunya 

While the top 10 places remain the same, race winner Vladimir Karpets moves into 13th position.

 103 riders (up from 93 riders) have scored at least one point on the 2007 UCI ProTour.

References

External links
Race website

2007
Volta
2007 in Spanish road cycling
2007 UCI ProTour
May 2007 sports events in Europe